Whitesville is an unincorporated community in Andrew County, in the U.S. state of Missouri.

History
A post office called Whitesville was established in 1850, and remained in operation until 1953. The community was named after John D. White, one of the founders.

References

Unincorporated communities in Andrew County, Missouri
Unincorporated communities in Missouri